The Best Of is a compilation album by Delerium, released on Nettwerk in 2004. The album collects most of the band's singles up to this point. In addition, it contains the album tracks "Terra Firma", "Run for It" (never released as a single, but included as a radio edit), and "Remembrance", as well as the previously unreleased songs "Paris" and "You & I".

A new remix of "Silence" served as the new single released from the album.

Track listing
 "Flowers Become Screens" (edit) (featuring Kristy Thirsk)
 "Silence" (radio edit) (featuring Sarah McLachlan)
 "Paris" (featuring Aude)
 "Truly" (The Wise  Radio Edit) (featuring Nerina Pallot)
 "Terra Firma" (featuring Aude)
 "Incantation" (edit) (featuring Kristy Thirsk)
 "After All" (radio edit) (featuring Jaël of Lunik)
 "Underwater" (Above & Beyond's 21st Century Remix) (featuring Rani)
 "Run for It" (radio edit) (featuring Leigh Nash)
 "Remembrance" (edit)
 "You & I" (featuring Zoë Johnston)
 "Innocente" (edit) (featuring Leigh Nash)
 "Euphoria (Firefly)" (radio edit) (featuring Jacqui Hunt)
 "Silence" (Above & Beyond's 21st Century Remix) (featuring Sarah McLachlan)

References
 Nettwerk Records Delerium discography (no longer found) (The Internet Archive's last archive as of 2007/10/14)

2004 compilation albums
Delerium albums